France did not send a team to the 1904 Summer Olympics in St. Louis, United States. Albert Corey, who was a French immigrant to the US and lived in America, won two silver medals in athletics. The International Olympic Committee attributes his silver medal in the marathon to France, and shows him as being part of a mixed team along with American athletes in the 4 mile team race.

Medalists

Results by event

Athletics

References

External links
 Official Olympic reports
 International Olympic Committee results database

Nations at the 1904 Summer Olympics
1904
Olympics